Son by Four is the second studio album recorded by Puerto Rican-American band Son by Four. It was released by Sony Music Latin on February 1, 2000. This album received a nomination for a Grammy Award for Best Salsa Album in the 43rd Annual Grammy Awards on February 21, 2001, and also became their first number-one album on the Billboard Top Latin Albums chart. The first single, "A Puro Dolor", was nominated for a Latin Grammy Award for Best Tropical Song in the 1st Annual Latin Grammy Awards on September 13, 2000.

Track listing
The track listing from Billboard.
"A Puro Dolor"  – 4:23
"Pero Eres Tú"  – 4:15
"Sofia"  – 4:20
"Poca Mujer"  – 4:31
"Qué Está Pasando"  – 4:08
"Mi Corazón Te Recuerda" – 5:06
"Dónde Está Tu Amor"  – 4:38
"Lo Qué Yo Más Quiero"  – 4:55
"Cómo Decírselo"  – 4:08
"Lo Que Yo No Tengo"  – 5:03
"Muévelo"  – 3:33
"Lunática"  – 5:06
"A Puro Dolor" (Ballad version)  – 3:33
"Sofía" (Remix)  – 4:38
"Purest of Pain" (bonus track)

Chart performance

Sales and certifications

See also
List of number-one Billboard Top Latin Albums of 2000
List of number-one Billboard Tropical Albums from the 2000s

Personnel
This information from Allmusic.
Caferino Caban – arranger
Roberto Calderón – sax (baritone)
José David Carrión – piano
Mario De Jesús – engineer, mixing
DJ Lucho – mixing
Danny Fuentes – trombone
Jose Gazmey – bass
Gustavo López – trumpet
Héctor David Marcano – timbales
J. Salazar – arranger
Son by Four – vocals
Ronnie Torres – engineer
Eliud Velázquez – banjo, percussion, conga
Alejandro López – art director

References

2000 albums
Son by Four albums
Sony Discos albums
Spanish-language albums
Albums produced by Sergio George